Jean-Pierre Baeumler (1 July 1948 – 22 January 2021) was a French politician. A member of the Socialist Party, he served as Deputy, Regional Councillor, and Mayor of Thann.

Biography
From 1984 to 1986, Baeumler served as Chef de Cabinet for Jean-Marie Bockel. He was elected Mayor of Thann in 1989, serving until 2014. He also served as Regional Councillor for Alsace from 1986 to 1998, and again from 2004 to 2010.

Jean-Pierre Baeumler died on 22 January 2021 at the age of 71.

References

1948 births
2021 deaths
Socialist Party (France) politicians